Ediya Coffee (이디야 커피) is a coffeehouse chain based in South Korea. As of 2019, the chain has 3,000 retail stores in South Korea. 

The coffee house opened its first store in 2001. In September 2005, it opened a branch in Beijing, China. As of September 2016, it had more than 2,000 stores after opening its 2000th location in Yongin, near Seoul. On November 20, 2019, Ediya Coffee opened its 3,000th store in Seo-gu, Daejeon.
In February 2011, the company moved to Yeoksam-dong, Gangnam-gu. 

In 2018, Ediya Coffee launched its delivery service through Yogiyo.

See also
 List of coffeehouse chains

References

External links
 

Coffee brands
South Korean brands
Coffeehouses and cafés in South Korea